Ralph E. Fletcher was a college football player. He was a quarterback for the University of Mississippi, selected All-Southern in 1912. Five days before the 1912 contest with rival Mississippi A&M, he was declared ineligible by the Southern Intercollegiate Athletic Association, because he had appeared in a Chicago freshman game. He starred in the game against Vanderbilt.

References

American football quarterbacks
Ole Miss Rebels football players
All-Southern college football players